Rome has an extensive internal transport system and is one of the most important road, rail and air hubs in Italy.

Rome banned diesel vehicles from its roads for the first time on Tuesday 14 January 2020. The local transport authority said the order would affect around one million vehicles.

Urban transport

Rome has an urban transport network which consists of buses, trams, rapid transit lines, light rail lines and suburban railways.

Roma servizi per la Mobilità is the municipally-owned public transport agency which is in charge of programming bus routes and providing real-time information and services to the user.

Atac (formerly an acronym for Azienda del Trasporto Autoferrotranviario del Comune di Roma, "Company for rail and road transport of the city of Rome") is the municipally-owned public transport company which operates most of the public transport lines in the city.

Roma TPL is a private company which operates a minority of bus lines.

Rome Metro 

The Rome Metro is the rapid transit system serving the city with three underground lines. The first track opened in 1955. There are three lines A, B - plus a branch called B1 - and C. Lines A and B intersect at Roma Termini station; line C is completely automated and intersects line A at San Giovanni Station.

Trams and commuter rail

Rome's overground rail transport comprises the tramway network, suburban and urban lines in and around the city of Rome, plus an "express line" to Fiumicino Airport. Whereas most FS-Regionale lines (Regional State Railways) provide a largely suburban service with more than twenty stations scattered throughout the city, a metro-like service is provided by the Roma-Lido (starting at Ostiense station) and Roma-Nord (starting at Flaminio station) rail lines, but with lower frequencies than Metro lines, as the Rome–Giardinetti light rail line. There is also the Lazio regional railways, a commuter rail system with seven lines which link the suburbs of the Rome Metropolitan Area. One of these lines serves the second airport of the city, Ciampino.

Buses

Rome has a comprehensive bus network, including three trolleybus routes (with additional trolleybus lines under construction). The Metrebus integrated fare system allows holders of tickets and integrated passes to travel on all companies' vehicles, within the validity time of the ticket purchased.

Classification of bus routes

Bus routes in Rome are identified by a symbol and a small letter:

U (Urban bus routes) - regular bus routes around Rome, calling at all stops and operating mostly between 5 am and 12 am. These routes include also one summer seasonal route (062). They are identified by a U letter and a blue background on their number reported on bus stops.
X (Express Bus Routes) - they are 12 bus routes (20, 30, 40, 50, 51, 60, 80, 90, 120F, 150F, 180F and 190F). These routes connect the centre of Rome with some far away suburbs and call at lesser stops than Urban routes and tend to have a higher frequency. On bus stops, they can be identified with a green colour and an X letter.
E (Exact bus routes) - they are a bunch of bus routes with a reduced timetable and operating mainly through peripheral areas of Rome. The name exact is due to their timetables being strictly adhered to. These routes also include those serving local cemeteries. On bus stops, they are identified with a brown colour and an E letter.

Route numberings and service areas

Most bus routes in Rome have three digits. The route numberings, in such cases, depends from the division in Rome in 10 zones (0 to 9). For instance, in case of route 916 it starts from zone 9 (Trionfale-Cornelia stop) and terminates at Rome Termini station on zone 1 (city centre).

The only exceptions to this system are routes 446 (connecting zones 9 and 2) and route 201 (unchanged since 1934). Both of which had been established on a previous numbering system not adjourned.

Other features which can be seen are:

Letters:

C××× (the letter C stands for cemetery, and as such it identifies those routes connecting residential areas with local cemeteries)
F (any bus route with the letter F after a numbering operates only on Sundays and public holidays)
H (route H is the only route in the entire network which number consists only in a letter)
N (any bus route with the letter N operates during nights only)

In other cases, there are routes whose first digit is 0. It stands for those peripheral routes operating outside the Grande Raccordo Anulare at all times.

Interurban bus transport

Various coach operators can be found in Rome, such as Flixbus, Marino, Busitalia Fast-SIMET and Baltour, operating various connections nationwide and internationally. These mainly depart from the bus stations in Tiburtina and Anagnina (Rome Metro).

Cotral is the main interurban bus operator in the Lazio region, connecting all the municipalities except from the insular Ponza and Ventotene. Cotral's main departure points in Rome are the bus stations at Tiburtina, Anagnina (Rome Metro), and Ponte Mammolo (Rome Metro), connecting the Italian capital to various destinations in the region.

Railways

Rome is one of the major hubs of Italian railway network, along with Milan and Bologna. The main railway station serving the city, Roma Termini, is the busiest station in Italy and one of the largest in Europe. The second largest station in the city is Roma Tiburtina, which is being redeveloped for high-speed rail service. Other notable stations include Roma Ostiense, Roma Trastevere, Roma Tuscolana, Roma San Pietro, Roma Nomentana and Roma Casilina.

Roads

Rome is served by an extensive motorway network. The most important motorway serving the city is the A90, also known as Grande Raccordo Anulare or GRA (Great Ringroad) which run in a circle around the city. The GRA is connected to the Roman branch of the A1 Milan - Naples and other two motorways which arrive further inside the city: the A24 Teramo - Roma and the A91 Roma - Fiumicino Aeroporto.

Traffic congestion in Rome is notorious. This issue is caused mainly by the undersized public transport network and the extremely high cars per capita ratio in the city. It is one of the highest ratios in the country. The Province of Rome is the second province in Italy by automobiles per capita (0,687) and 5th by vehicles per capita (0,87).

Motor Traffic Limited Zone (ZTL)

Chronic congestion caused by cars led to the partial banning of motor traffic from the central part of the city during workdays, from 6 am to 6 pm. This area is called Zona a Traffico Limitato (ZTL), motor traffic limited zone.

Heavy traffic due to night-life crowds during weekends led in recent years to the creation of other ZTLs in the Trastevere and S. Lorenzo districts during the night, and to experimentation with a new night ZTL also in the city centre (plans are underway to create a night ZTL in the Testaccio district as well). In spite of all these measures, traffic in Rome remains an unsolved problem.

Airports

Rome is served by three civil airports. The intercontinental Leonardo Da Vinci Airport is Italy's largest airport both for national and international traffic and is one of the busiest in Europe. It is more commonly known as Fiumicino, as it is located within the territory of the nearby comune of Fiumicino, in the south-west of Rome. The older Rome Ciampino Airport is a joint civilian and military airport. These main two airports are owned and managed by Aeroporti di Roma.

A fourth airport in the eastern part of the city, the Aeroporto di Centocelle (dedicated to Francesco Baracca), is no longer open to civil flights; it hosts the Comando di Squadra Aerea (which coordinates the activities of the Aeronautica Militare) and the Comando Operativo di Vertice Interforze (which coordinates all Italian military activities), although large parts of the airport are being redeveloped as a public park.

Statistics
The average amount of time people spend commuting with public transit in Rome, for example to and from work, on a weekday is 79 min. 22% of public transit riders, ride for more than 2 hours every day. The average amount of time people wait at a stop or station for public transit is 20 min, while 39% of riders wait for over 20 minutes on average every day. The average distance people usually ride in a single trip with public transit is 6.8 km, while 12% travel for over 12 km in a single direction.

See also 

 Economy of Rome
 History of Rome
 Tourism in Rome
 Transport in Italy

References

External links

 Official ATAC website—

 
Metropolitan City of Rome Capital
Transport in Lazio